Szőny was a town in Hungary. Since 1977, it has been part of the city of Komárom.

History
The Roman legion Legio I Adiutrix was based here from 86 AD to the mid-5th century and took part in several Parthian wars.

The town was known as Brigetio to the Romans, and was the site of the death of Roman Emperor Valentinian I An important Roman military diploma was found in the town in the early twentieth century - it is now in the British Museum's collection. Later during the Middle Ages the town was called Camarum. The town has one of the earliest records of conjoined twins - Helen and Judith.

Her name was first mentioned in a charter in 1211 as Sun.
Later in 1249 it was mentioned as Sceun as the village of the Archbishop of Esztergom, which was then traded by King Béla IV for another village.  In 1269 it was mentioned as terra Sceun, in 1397 as possessio Zyun and in 1422 as villa Zwn, as a Komárom castle estate.  In 1460, it was already an oppidum Zwny, i.e. a town, whose customs and income belonged to the Komárom castle.
It was destroyed by the Ottomans in 1592.  On 12th September, in 1627 here II.  Ferdinand and the Turkish Sultan made the Peace of Szőnyi here.
The peace document was issued in three languages: Hungarian, Latin and Turkish.  The document included in Article 11 reaffirmed the 1606 Zsitvatorok, 1615 Vienna, 1618 Komárom and 1625 colonial treaties.

During the 1848-49 revolution and war of independence, there were several major battles within the boundaries of the village.  At the beginning of the 20th century, several pieces of the cannonballs that fell in the line of fire of the cannons during the siege of Komárom were still visible in the wall of the Catholic church.

During the Oil Campaign of World War II, the Szőny oil refinery was a strategic bombing target.

References

Oil campaign of World War II
Former municipalities of Hungary
Roman settlements in Hungary
Komárom
Roman legionary fortresses in Hungary
Roman fortifications in Pannonia Superior